Philip Sandblom (October 29, 1903 – February 21, 2001) was a Swedish academician, professor of surgery and sailor who competed in the 1928 Summer Olympics. He served as rector of Lund University between 1957 and 1968.

Philip Sandblom was the son of the dentist John Sandblom, and was born in Chicago, Illinois, United States; like his father, he was also a prominent sailor in his youth. At the 1928 Summer Olympics in Amsterdam, he was a crew member of the Swedish boat Sylvia together with his father which won the bronze medal in the 8 metre class.

Sandblom graduated from the Karolinska Institute with the dissertation The tensile strength of healing wounds in 1944. In 1950, Sandblom was made professor of surgery at Lund University, and he later served as rector of the University in 1957–1968.

After retiring from Lund University, Sandblom was active as a physician and scientist in San Diego, California, USA, and Lausanne, Switzerland. He died in Lausanne in 2001.

External links
profile

1903 births
2001 deaths
People from Chicago
Swedish male sailors (sport)
Swedish surgeons
Academic staff of Lund University
Rectors of Lund University
Olympic sailors of Sweden
Sailors at the 1928 Summer Olympics – 8 Metre
Olympic bronze medalists for Sweden
Olympic medalists in sailing
Medalists at the 1928 Summer Olympics
20th-century surgeons